Cymindis neglecta is a species of ground beetle in the subfamily Harpalinae. It was described by Haldeman in 1843.

References

neglecta
Beetles described in 1843